The 1994 Robert Morris Colonials football team represented Robert Morris College, now Robert Morris University, as an independent during the 1994 NCAA Division I-AA football season. The Colonials were led by head coach Joe Walton during their inaugural season, and played their home games at Moon Stadium on the campus of Moon Area High School.

Schedule

References

Robert Morris
Robert Morris Colonials football seasons
Robert Morris Colonials football